The Middle Cathedral Rock is a prominent rock face on the south side of Yosemite Valley, California.  El Capitan lies due north of Middle Cathedral. Middle Cathedral's East Buttress Route is recognized in the historic climbing text Fifty Classic Climbs of North America.

References

External links 
 

Rock formations of Yosemite National Park
Climbing areas of California
Mountains of Mariposa County, California